Xu Zechen (born in 1978 in Donghai County, Jiangsu) is a Chinese author of literary fiction. He currently works as an editor at People's Literature Magazine.  In 2009 he was a writer in residence at Creighton University and in 2010 he attended the International Writing Program at the University of Iowa.

Awards 
 2019 - Awarded the 10th Mao Dun Literature Prize for "Northward"
 2016 - Awarded the 1st Cross-Strait Young Writers Prize for "Jerusalem"
 2015 - Nominated for the 9th Mao Dun Literature Prize for "Jerusalem"
 2014 - Awarded the Lao She Literary Award for "Jerusalem"
 2014 - Awarded the Short Story Award of the 7th Lu Xun Literary Prize for If A Snowstorm Seals the Door

Works
Representative works include the following (translated titles are approximate):

Novels and Novellas 
《耶路撒冷》 (Jerusalem)
《跑步穿过中关村》 Running Through Beijing (tr. by Eric Abrahamsen)
《午夜之门》 (Midnight's Door)
《夜火车》(Night Train)
《天上人间》(Heaven on Earth)
《北上》(Northward)
《苍声》Voice Change (tr. by Charles Laughlin)
《啊，北京》
《西夏》(Western Xia/Tangut)
《人间烟火》
《逆时针》
《居延》(Juyan)
《小城市》(Small Town)

Short Stories 
《花街》(Flower street)
《最后一个猎人》(The last hunter)
《伞兵与卖油郎》(The parachuter and the oil seller)
《纸马》(Paper horses)
《我们的老海》(Our old sea)
《这些年我一直在路上》(I've been on the road a few years)
《如果大雪封门》 If a Snowstorm Seals the Door (tr. by Jeremy Tiang)
《时间简史》 A Brief History of Time (tr. by Eric Abrahamsen]
《露天电影》 Outdoor Film (tr. by Eric Abrahamsen]
《轮子是圆的》 Wheels are round (tr. by Eric Abrahamsen]
《雪夜访戴》 Visiting Dai on a Snowy Evening (tr. by Eric Abrahamsen]
《狗叫了一天》 The Dog's Been Barking All Day, July 2017 (tr. by Eric Abrahamsen]
《奔马》 Galloping Horses (tr. by Helen Wang)
《弃婴》 Throwing Out the Baby (tr. by Nicky Harman)
《镜与刀》 (Mirror and Knife)
《九年》 (Nine Years)
《忆秦娥》 Remembering Qin E (tr. by Jeremy Tiang)

External links 
 Xu Zechen profile on Paper Republic
 Xu Zechen profile on Words Without Borders
 Xu Zechen profile on MCLC
 Xu Zechen profile on mychinesebooks
 Xu Zechen on chinese-shortstories (in French)

References 

1978 births
Living people
Writers from Lianyungang
Chinese male novelists
People's Republic of China novelists
Mao Dun Literature Prize laureates